The Grammy Award for Best Sound Track Album or Recording of Original Cast From a Motion Picture or Television was awarded from 1959 to 1962.  The award has had several minor name changes:

In 1959 the award was known as Best Sound Track Album, Dramatic Picture Score or Original Cast
In 1960 it was awarded as Best Sound Track Album, Original Cast - Motion Picture or Television
From 1961 to 1962 it was awarded as Best Sound Track Album or Recording of Original Cast From a Motion Picture or Television

Years reflect the year in which the Grammy Awards were handed out, for music released in the previous year.

Nominated list

Sound Track Album or Recording of Original Cast from a Motion Picture or Television
Album awards